Roseline Fonkwa- Moundjongui   born August, 1975) is a Cameroonian movie producer and a business woman who owns  3R productions. In 2017, she was recognized for her work as a producer in the movie Breach of Trust
In 2015, she won the Cameroon Career Women Awards  (2015) edition in business and Saker Baptist College pride award designated for ex-students in their respective skills,Fonkwa won still in Business.

Selected filmography 

Breach of Trust (2017) Alongside Epule Jeffrey

2017 
 Breach of Trust featuring Epule Jeffrey

Awards and recognition

See also 

List of Cameroonian Actors
Cinema of Cameroon

References

External links
 

Living people
Cameroonian film directors
Cameroonian actresses
1975 births